Nightmare of 1934 was the name of a mural painting by mystery artist Jere Miah II that was destroyed by John Smiukse on August 31, 1934. The painting satirized Roosevelt, his cabinet and the New Deal.

Description

The painting hung in the Westchester Institute of Fine Arts in Tarrytown, New York, where the public were charged 25¢ to view it.

Smiukse
Smiukse (b. 1908) was a Latvian who had jumped ship in New York Harbor in 1927 and had been making a living as a house painter in the Bronx.  He had heard of the painting and was offended by the inclusion of Eleanor Roosevelt and her children in it.

Destruction
Smiukse, on his day off, calmly went to the gallery, paid his fee, and went in to view the painting. There, in front of a group of housewives, he splashed the painting with paint remover, pulled it off the wall and lit it up. The flames soon went out, but the painting was ruined. He was arrested on the spot. Painter Jonas Lie put up a bail of $500 for Smiuske.

Sentencing
Police Judge William A. H. Ely sentenced John Smiukse to six months in the Westchester County Penitentiary at Eastview for malicious mischief. He was later re-arraigned for illegal entry.

Publicity
The incident can be seen on The March of Time pilot, Pilot Film # 3.

References 

Lost paintings
1934 paintings
1934 crimes in the United States
1934 in New York (state)
Vandalized works of art in New York (state)
Works about Franklin D. Roosevelt
Ceres (mythology)
Paintings of Roman goddesses